Naan khaliya  is a dish that originates from Aurangabad, Maharashtra in India. It is a concoction of mutton and a variety of spices. Naan is a bread made in a tandoor (hot furnace), while khaliya is a mixture of mutton or beef and various spices.

History 
When Mohammad Tughlaq shifted his capital from Delhi to Daulatabad, there was a mass exodus of people from Delhi to Daulatabad. On the way to Daulatabad, the huge army of Tughlaq was exhausted. It was a difficult task to provide such a big army with food. So the shahi bawarchis (royal cooks) dug a hot furnace and rolled out thousands of naan. Meanwhile, qalia was prepared by slowly cooking either Beef or Mutton and adding number of local spices in the huge degh cauldron. Later on, this dish was commonly eat by sipahi  Soldiers and was also called 'siphaaiyon ka khana' or 'fauji ka khana'. It is commonly made in Aurangabad and specially in Weddings as well as on special occasions.

Traditional preparation 
The naan are prepared in an open clay oven, which is mounted in a hole in the ground. The fire is from a side hole. The baker (generally called as bhatiyara) sits next to the oven and places the naan in the oven for baking, these naan are picked out with specially designed rods. These Naan are quite fluffy. Each of these naan get a brush of turmeric and jaggery water, as soon as they are baked. This gives the naan golden colour and also makes it last longer.

The qalia is a soupy curry, made with a number of ingredients and with a long process. There are a number of variations in spices and the ingredients across the towns close to Aurangabad. The qalia from Aurangabad is yogurt based, whereas the one from Khuldabad is lemon based. The qalia is prepared in a big cauldron called degh, it has a top layer of oil. This spicy oil on top is called tari.

See also

 List of lamb dishes

References 

Indian meat dishes
South Asian curries
Culture of Aurangabad, Maharashtra
Mughlai cuisine
Pakistani meat dishes
Lamb dishes